Rich Stachowski (born March 29, 1961) is a former American football defensive tackle. He played for the Denver Broncos in 1983.

References

1961 births
Living people
American football defensive tackles
California Golden Bears football players
Denver Broncos players